Hutchison Port Holdings Limited (HPH), trading as Hutchison Ports, is a private holding company incorporated in the British Virgin Islands. The port operator group is a subsidiary of CK Hutchison Holdings (formerly Hutchison Whampoa). Some operation of the company were listed as Hutchison Port Holdings Trust in Singapore Exchange.

In 2016, the network comprised 48 port operations throughout Asia, the Middle East, Africa, Europe, the Americas and Australasia.

History 
In 2005, HPH was the largest port operator in the world, with a 33.2 million TEU throughput, and 8.3% world market share.

In April 2006, Hutchison Whampoa sold a 20% share of Hutchison Port Holdings Limited to PSA International for $US4.4 billion, retaining ownership of the remaining 80%.

In September 2016, HPH rebranded its network as Hutchison Ports.

In December 2016, the Chornomorsk commercial seaport in western Ukraine, signed a cooperation agreement with Hutchison Ports. Among the agreed upon points are the company's entry into the port as a terminal operator as of 2017. Hutchison will provide expert consultative services to reform and improve Ukraine's port industry.

Associate company

Hutchison Port Holdings Trust
Hutchison Port Holdings Trust is a listed trust in Singapore Exchange. Hutchison Whampoa only owned 25% stake, but had the rights to influence the trust by controlling the key stake of changing the trustee they nominated before the initial public offering.

In December 2016 The Trust's subsidiaries  and Shenzhen Pingyan Multimodal Company Limited, jointly purchased 80% shares of Huizhou International Container Terminals (HICT) from Hutchison Port Holdings for US$86.26 million.

In January, 2017 HPH Trust signed a strategic agreement to manage the operations at five terminals, including 16 berths in Kwai Tsing in Hong Kong.

Port assets

Notes

References

External links

CK Hutchison Holdings
Offshore companies of the British Virgin Islands
Holding companies of Hong Kong
Port operating companies
Companies listed on the Singapore Exchange